The 2013 Campeonato Brasileiro Série A was the 57th edition of the Campeonato Brasileiro Série A, the top-level of professional football in Brazil. Fluminense come in as the defending champions, having won the title in the 2012 season. On 13 November 2013, Cruzeiro won the title for the third time.

For the first time since the league adopted the 20-team, double round-robin format, all four teams promoted from Série B survived.

Average attendance

Format and results
For the eleventh consecutive season, the tournament was played in a double round-robin system. In a fashion similar to its second title in 2003, Cruzeiro led the rankings for most of the tournament, declared champion in the fifth to last round. The bottom four teams, Fluminense, Vasco, Ponte Preta and Nautico were relegated to play in the Campeonato Brasileiro Série B in the 2014 season.

The tournament had a one-month interruption between June 9 and July 6 due to the 2013 FIFA Confederations Cup, which took place in Brazil.

Although Flamengo finished the championship just above the relegation positions, it was punished by the Superior Court of Sport Justice for irregularly calling in a player during a match against Cruzeiro - André Santos, who was suspended for a red card received at his previous Copa do Brasil match. The team lost four points - three for the irregular usage of a player and a fourth one which the team won due to the game resulting in a tie - and ended up temporarily being relegated. However, Portuguesa had also irregularly called in a player against Grêmio - Héverton the day after. The team also lost four points - three for the irregular usage of a player and a fourth one which the team won due to the game resulting in a tie - and ended up being relegated. This way, with both punishments, Fluminense FC managed to finish the championship above the relegation positions and was spared from having to compete in the next year's second division for the third time on the last 2 decades.  Portuguesa's irregular usage of a player raised many suspicions, both from Flamengo's - who had also used an irregular player the day before - and Fluminense's side. Even though Portuguesa's former president Ilidio Lico admitted selling the Série A spot, no clue to whom it was sold was found, so the Court's decision stood. This relegation was a downhill for Portuguesa, as the team was relegated to Brazilian Third Division - Série C the next year, after playing Série B.

International qualification
The Série A served as a qualifier to CONMEBOL's 2014 Copa Libertadores. Cruzeiro and Gremio qualified to the Second Stage of the competition, while Atletico Paranaense qualified to the First Stage. Botafogo qualified to the First Stage as well since Ponte Preta lost the 2013 Copa Sudamericana Finals.

Teams

Stadiums and locations

Personnel and kits

Managerial changes

League table

Results

Positions by round

Top scorers

References

External links

Official webpage 
Official regulations 
2013 Campeonato Brasileiro Série A at Soccerway

Campeonato Brasileiro Série A seasons
1